Právo Na Šťastie is the sixth album by the Slovak punk rock band Iné Kafe, released on 14 November 2011.

Track listing
 Standard Edition

 Limited Edition

Personnel
 Vratko Rohoň - vocals, guitar
 Peter "Forus" Fóra - bass, backing vocals
 Jozef "Dodo" Praženec – drums

Guest artists
 Braňo "Gza" Wáclav - (14)
 Jimi Cimbala - guitar solo (1)
 Ľubomír Horák - trombone (9)
 Marek Rakovický - hammond, slide guitar, keyboard (7, 4, 9, 13)
 Matej Turcer - guitar (3, 4, 7)
 Peter "Pepe" Huraj - saxophone (9)
 Peter "Petko" Opet - trumpet (9)
 Richard Klimo - (4)
 Roman "Hulo" Hulín - (4)
 Viliam Bujnovský - keyboard (7, 14)
 Vladimír Moravčík - (4)
 Vincent Šušol - backing vocals (4, 9, 13)

References

2011 albums
Iné Kafe albums